The Schizoporellidae is a family within the bryozoan order Cheilostomatida. Colonies are encrusting on shells and rocks or upright bilaminar branches or sheets. The zooidal orifice has a narrow V-shaped sinus.

References 

Cheilostomatida
Bryozoan families
Extant Eocene first appearances